John Marsden may refer to:
 John Marsden (footballer) (born 1992), English footballer
 John Marsden (lawyer) (1942–2006), Australian solicitor
 John Marsden (rower) (1915–2004), English rower, intelligence officer and teacher
 John Marsden (rugby league) (born 1953), English rugby league footballer of the 1970s and 1980s
 John Marsden (writer) (born 1950), Australian author of books for children and young adults
 John Howard Marsden (1803–1891), English vicar and archaeologist
 John Buxton Marsden (1803–1870), English cleric, historical writer and editor
 John Morris Marsden (1857–1939), British solicitor and philatelist
 Dr. John Marsden, the host of Body Hits